Veckans singellista or Veckolista singlar is a record chart that ranks the best-performing singles of Sweden. Chart is published and owned by IFPI Sverige. Since 2006 chart was based on weekly physical and digital sales data compiled by Swedish Recording Industry Association.

During the 2000s, 200 singles reached the number-one position on the chart. Markoolio was the most successful artist at reaching the top spot, with 10 number-one singles. Las Ketchup's single "The Ketchup Song (Aserejé)" spent 16 weeks at number one in 2002 and one week in 2003, which was the longest spell at the top of the chart of the decade.

The first number one of the decade, the "Millennium 2" by Markoolio, was a holdover from the end of 1999. "Higher" by Erik Grönwall was the final number one of the decade.

Number-one singles

By artist

References

External links
 Archive of Veckans singellista at Sverigetopplistan 
 Archive of Veckans singellista at swedishcharts.com

Number-one singles
Sweden
2000s